The Stevenage Sharks were a semi-professional English ice hockey team based in Stevenage that played the 1992/93 season. Their home ice was the Stevenage Ice Bowl. Stevenage teams had played non-import hockey from the rink's opening in 1988 until 1992.

Their first official home game as an import league team came on Wednesday 2 September 1992, when they played host to Toronto Buds in an International challenge match, losing 10–6 to their Canadian visitors.

The Stevenage Sharks debuted in competitive action on Saturday 12 September 1992 in front of over 1,200 fans.

Former Peterborough Pirates and Solent Vikings manager Steve Rattle and the much travelled Tom Sheard were the driving forces behind the newly formed outfit. With his eye for a good import, Rattle signed Dave Hyrsky and Ray Gallagher from Canada's Laurentian University and the well travelled Darren Mattias.

The Brits who joined up included the Aisbitt brothers, Barrie and John, from the north-east and Medway goalie Dean Russell-Samways. The rest of the squad was made up of enthusiastic players who has seen action only in the under-21 league or the English conference.

After only one win from six games in the Autumn Trophy, the Sharks began to show their teeth when the English League campaign began, though by then Gallagher had returned across the pond. In his place came Cardiff's Trent Andison who demolished Sunderland with ten goals in Sharks' first league game.

The season started to turn sour in mid-November when Mattias left to join Bristol. Management could not afford to look across the Atlantic and Rattle was fortunate to locate Joel Gouin who was already living in the UK. In mid-December, matters reached rock bottom when the rink was placed in the hands of receivers and Hyrsky and Andison flew home. But at Christmas a small group of supporters spearheaded by Richard Street and Dave Clarke took over control of the team and by the first weekend of 1993, Hyrsky and Andison were back with Hyrsky taking on the added responsibility of playing coach. Instead of a revival however, fate struck a devastating blow when Andison was sidelined with a serious leg injury that kept him out for over a month.

The Stevenage Sharks were the visitors as Guildford Flames played their first game at the Guildford Spectrum on Saturday 23 January 1993, with the Flames winning 13–3 in front of 2,139 spectators.

With morale dropping and finances still lacking, it looked as though the Sharks would have trouble in seeing out their inaugural season but the fans stayed loyal and with the British guys now looking more like seasoned import players, the team completed the campaign, finishing 5th in Conference B of the English League.

The final nail in Stevenage's coffin came soon after the season's end when receivers closed the doors of the Ice Bowl.

Other Stevenage teams include the Stevenage Strikers (1989–93) and the Stevenage Oilers (1996/97).

1992/1993 Season Standings

English League - Conference B

1992/1993 English League Schedule And Results

Sport in Hertfordshire
Defunct ice hockey teams in the United Kingdom
Ice hockey teams in England
Stevenage